Kooiman is a Dutch language occupational surname. Kooi in the name means "cage" in Dutch, but generally referred to a pen or duck decoy, and the name often originated with a duck breeder, herder, or cage maker. Variant spellings are Cooiman, Kooimans, Coyman, Coymen, Kooijman(s), and Kooyman(s). People with the surname include:

Anna Kooiman (born 1984), American television news anchor and personality
Cle Kooiman (born 1963), American soccer defender
 (born 1986), Dutch speed skater
Esther Kooiman (born 1968), Dutch-French pornographic film actress
Ewald Kooiman (1938-2009), Dutch organist
Frank Kooiman (born 1970), Dutch football goalkeeper
Nine Kooiman (born 1980), Dutch Socialist Party politician
Wim Kooiman (born 1960), Dutch football defender

References

Dutch-language surnames
Occupational surnames

de:Kooiman
nl:Kooiman
ru:Kooiman